Marietje Jan de Gortersdochter (died 21 February 1539) was a Dutch Anabaptist. She is known in history as a martyr of the Anabaptist faith and the mother of the Anabaptist leader David Joris. She was married to the merchant Joris van Amersfoort. She was executed by decapitation in Delft after banned books had been found among her possessions.

References 
Kees Kuiken, Gortersdr., Marietje Jan de, in: Digitaal Vrouwenlexicon van Nederland. URL: http://resources.huygens.knaw.nl/vrouwenlexicon/lemmata/data/Gortersdr [13/01/2014]

1539 deaths
Dutch Anabaptists
Executed Dutch women
16th-century Dutch people
Executed Dutch people
Year of birth unknown
People executed for heresy
16th-century executions
16th-century Dutch women